Ruukki is a former municipality of Finland.

It is located in the province of Oulu and is part of the Northern Ostrobothnia region.

The municipality was unilingually Finnish.

In 2007 municipality of Ruukki joined together with Siikajoki.

References

External links 

Former municipalities of Finland
Siikajoki
Populated places disestablished in 2007